The Al Mohannadi tribe is an Arab tribal confederation based primarily in the Arab states of the Persian Gulf, especially in Qatar. Being a tribal confederation that emerged in the coastal town of Al Khor, the larger portion of its members belong to the Bani Hajer tribe. It is also known as Al-Mahanda. The leading family of the tribe was the Al-Misned family. The other families are Al-Bin Ali, Al-Ibrahim, Al-Shugari, Al-Matwi of Al-Shugari, Al-Qashasha, Al-Hassan, Al-Baduh, and Al-Bin Matar.

The tribe was one of the earliest settlers in Al Khor in Qatar. In 1908, J. G. Lorimer, a British historian, wrote that Al Khor was frequently referred to as 'Khor al-Mahandah [Mohannadi]'. He also wrote that the village consisted of 400 stone and mud houses belonging to the tribe. They also settled the nearby village of Al Thakhira. In 1908, Lorimer noted that the village comprised 100 houses of the Al Mohannadi tribe.

References

Bahraini families
Bedouin groups
Qatari families
Tribes of Arabia